The 1907 Brown Bears football team represented Brown University as an independent during the 1907 college football season. Led by eighth-year head coach Edward N. Robinson, Brown compiled a record of 7–3.

Schedule

References

Brown
Brown Bears football seasons
Brown Bears football